The War Report 2: Report the War is the fourth  studio album by American hip hop duo Capone-N-Noreaga. It is the sequel to the duo's 1997 debut album, The War Report. It was released on July 13, 2010. The first single from the album is "Hood Pride", which features Faith Evans, was released on June 8, 2010. A video was released for "Pain" on July 11, 2010. Another video was released for "My Attribute" on July 12, 2010. A video was also released for "Hood Pride" on August 18, 2010.

Track listing

Charts

References

2010 albums
Capone-N-Noreaga albums
EMI Records albums
Albums produced by the Alchemist (musician)
Albums produced by DJ Green Lantern
Albums produced by Just Blaze
Albums produced by Buckwild
Albums produced by Tha Bizness
Albums produced by Scram Jones
Albums produced by AraabMuzik
Sequel albums